Joseph Baldwin (1827–1899) was an American educationist, "father of the normal school system".

Joseph Baldwin may also refer to:

Joseph G. Baldwin (1815–1864), American writer and California Supreme Court Justice
Joseph M. Baldwin (1878–1945), Australian, Victorian government astronomer 1920–1943
Joseph C. Baldwin (1897–1957), American Republican congressman for New York
Joseph Baldwin (footballer), English footballer

See also
Joseph Baldwin Academy, Missouri